William, Will, Willie, or Bill Robertson may refer to:

Military personnel and intelligence officials
Bill Robertson (Australian intelligence officer) (1917–2011), Australian Army officer and director of the Australian Secret Intelligence Service
William Robertson (VC) (1865–1949), Scottish sergeant-major and Victoria Cross recipient
Sir William Robertson, 1st Baronet (1860–1933), British Army officer
William Albert Robertson (1885–1942), Scottish rugby union international, doctor and soldier
William "Rip" Robertson (1920–1970), American covert agent

Politicians, judges, and viceroys
William Robertson (Western Quebec and Upper Canada) ( – 1806), Scottish-born entrepreneur and colonial-era political figure
William Robertson (Nova Scotia), Scottish-descended merchant and political figure in Canadian colonies 
William J. Robertson (1817–1898), American jurist from Virginia
William H. Robertson (1823–1898), American lawyer and politician from New York
William Tindal Robertson (1825–1889), English Member of Parliament for Brighton, 1886–1889
William Robertson (Australian politician) (1839–1892), barrister and politician in colonial Victoria, Australia
William A. Robertson (1837–1889), American state legislator in Louisiana
William Robertson (Ontario) (1897–1948), Canadian politician in the Legislative Assembly of Ontario
William Archibald Robertson (1832–1926), prospector and Scottish-born political figure in British Columbia
William Charles Fleming Robertson (1867–1937), British Governor of Barbados
William Robertson, Lord Robertson (1753–1853), Scottish lawyer
William Russell Robertson (1853–1930), Canadian politician in the Legislative Assembly of British Columbia

Sportspeople and sports executives

Association footballers
Bill Robertson (English footballer) (1923–2003), English football goalkeeper for Chelsea, Birmingham City and Stoke City
Bill Robertson (Scottish footballer) (1928–1973), Scottish football goalkeeper for Chelsea and Leyton Orient
William Robertson (footballer, born 1874) (1874 – after 1904), Scottish inside forward or wing half with Abercorn, Small Heath and Bristol Rovers
William Robertson (footballer, born 1907) (1907–1980), Scottish full back with Stoke City, Manchester United and Reading
William Robertson (1880s footballer) (1866–1926), Scottish footballer with Dumbarton and Scotland
Willie Robertson (footballer) (born 1993), Scottish footballer

Cricketers
William Robertson (Australian cricketer) or Digger Robertson (1861–1938), Australian batsman who played for Victoria and in California
William Robertson (Canterbury cricketer) (1864–1912), New Zealand cricketer who played for Canterbury from 1894 to 1901
William Robertson (Otago cricketer) (born 1940), New Zealand cricketer who played for Otago from 1960 to 1961
William Robertson (Middlesex cricketer) (1879–1950), English cricketer who played for Middlesex County Cricket Club from 1900 to 1919
William Robertson (Jersey cricketer) (born 1998), English cricketer who plays for Jersey

Other sportspeople and sports executives
Bill Robertson (Australian footballer) (1879–1957), Australian rules footballer for Geelong
William Albert Robertson (1885–1942), Scottish rugby union international, doctor and soldier
William E. Robertson, American baseball commissioner

Others
William Robertson (pastoralist) (died 1914), pioneer of South Australia
William Robertson (Australian settler) (1798–1874), Scottish-born pioneer in Tasmania and Victoria
William Robertson (Hebraist), Scottish Hebraist
William B. Robertson (1893–1943), American aviator and aviation executive
William Robertson (historian) (1721–1793), Scottish writer and academic
William Robertson (Irish architect) (1770–1850), Irish architect with Scottish roots
William Robertson (architect) (1786–1841), Scottish architect
William Bruce Robertson (1820–1886), Scottish Secession/United Presbyterian Church minister
William Robertson (Irish priest) (1705–1783), Irish clergyman, theological writer and schoolmaster
Willie Robertson (born 1972), American TV personality and outdoorsman, known for the reality TV series Duck Dynasty
Bill Robertson (director), Canadian film and television director, producer and screenwriter
William Robertson (antiquary) (1740–1803), Scottish historian and antiquary
William Robertson (statistician) (1818–1882), Scottish physician, statistician and amateur photographer
William Henry Robertson (physician) (1810–1897), English physician
William W. Robertson (1941–2008), American lawyer, US Attorney for District of New Jersey

See also
Robertson (surname)